Maboloke Nepo Serage (born 14 April 2000) is a South African field hockey player for the South African national team.

International career

Under–18
She participated at the 2018 Summer Youth Olympics.

National team
Nepo participated at the  2022 Women's FIH Hockey World Cup.

Personal life
She attended Hoërskool Witteberg. In 2022, she graduated from University of Cape Town with a bachelor of science in physiotherapy.

References

External links

2000 births
Living people
South African female field hockey players
University of Cape Town alumni
Female field hockey goalkeepers
Field hockey players at the 2018 Summer Youth Olympics
South African physiotherapists
21st-century South African women
Field hockey players from Cape Town
Field hockey players at the 2022 Commonwealth Games

2023 FIH Indoor Hockey World Cup players